Seven Guns for the MacGregors is a Technicolor 1966 Spaghetti Western. It is the directorial debut film of Franco Giraldi (here credited as Frank Garfield), who was Sergio Leone's assistant in A Fistful of Dollars. The film gained a great commercial success and generated an immediate sequel, Up the MacGregors! (1967), again directed by Giraldi,

Plot
The MacGregors, horse ranchers of Scottish descent, are underway to the market when they are robbed of their horses by a gang under the helm of a corrupt sheriff. One of the brothers infiltrates the gang but his first attempt tries to play them backfires.

Cast 
 Robert Woods as Gregor MacGregor
 Fernando Sancho as Miguel
 Agata Flori as Rosita Carson
 Nazzareno Zamperla as Peter MacGregor
 Paolo Magalotti as Kenneth MacGregor
 Leo Anchóriz as Santillana
 Perla Cristal as Perla
 George Rigaud as Alastair MacGregor
 Manuel Zarzo as David MacGregor
 Alberto Dell'Acqua as Dick MacGregor (credited as Cole Kitosch)
 Julio Pérez Tabernero as Mark MacGregor
 Cris Huerta as Crawford
 Rafael Bardem as Justice Garland
 Víctor Israel as Trevor

Release
Seven Guns for the MacGregors was released ins 1966. It was distributed by U.N.I.D.I.S. in Italy. The film was followed by the sequel Up the MacGregors! featuring overlapping plot and character similarities.

Reception
In contemporary reviews, from "Japa." of Variety found the film to have a "predictable but fast moving plotline" noting that the "offbeat flavor of having the Scottish MacGregor clan living in the rough in 19th century Texas gives this Italian western an added zing., helping overcome simplistic scripting and pedestrian direction." and that the film "avoids pitfalls of many overblown Italo-made westerns which tend to become over philosophical and dramatic in their approach to violence and love in the old west." A review in the Monthly Film Bulletin noted that the films "colour is so variable and that the script plays it straight around the middle, where the blood-letting makes an uneasy contrast with the tongue-incheek bravado of the earlier scenes."

References

Footnotes

Sources

External links
 
 

1968 films
Italian Western (genre) films
Spaghetti Western films
Films directed by Franco Giraldi
1968 Western (genre) films
Films scored by Ennio Morricone
Films shot in Almería
1968 directorial debut films
1960s Italian films